Incises (1994/2001) and Sur Incises (1996/1998) are two related works of the French composer Pierre Boulez. The pitches of the row used in Incises and Sur Incises are based on the Sacher hexachord, the same as those used in the rows for Répons, Messagesquisse, and Dérive 1.

Incises 
Incises ("Interpolations") for solo piano was composed in 1994 as a test piece for the Umberto Micheli Piano Competition, where it was first performed on 21 October 1994. Boulez revised it in 2001. Incises was Boulez's first work for solo piano since his Third Piano Sonata of 1955–57/63. The piece lasts less than ten minutes.

The work plays with contrasts of gestures and textures, for instance, repeated pitches or chords in an even tempo interrupted by violent melodic arcs, or sparse chordal interjections without discernible rhythm over long held sonorities.

Reviewing of a 2005 performance of Incises, Tim Page described it: "Incises is charged with a bright, cold, hard brilliance, like a spray of crushed ice. It is dense with events even when it is silent for a moment, Boulez's music never really 'rests' but also far more generous in its emotional expression than much of his earlier work."

Sur Incises 
Boulez wrote Sur Incises a few years later and dedicated it to Paul Sacher on his 90th birthday. It was premiered on 30 August 1998 by the Ensemble InterContemporain conducted by David Robertson in Edinburgh's Usher Hall. The piece lasts about forty minutes. It was awarded the Grawemeyer Award for Music Composition given by the University of Louisville.

Based on the material of Incises, Sur Incises is a two-movement work (the movements are called "Moment I" and "Moment II") for three pianos, three harps, and three percussion parts, which use a variety of tuned percussion instruments: vibraphone, marimba, glockenspiel, steel drums, tubular bells, and crotales. Here the sounds of the piano in Incises are broken into component parts played by the harps and percussion, and they are deployed across space by spreading the three groups apart in the performance area. This kind of reworking of an earlier piece is characteristic of Boulez, the first instance being Structures.

Anthony Tommasini described a 1999 performance of Sur Incises:

Paul Griffiths heard echoes of Debussy's L'isle joyeuse in Sur Incises, while others have noted its debt to Stravinsky's Les Noces or Bartok's Sonata for Two Pianos and Percussion. Griffiths described the work:

Tom Service wrote in The Guardian that:

Service described a 2008 performance: "There's a polish and a voluptuousness about this music that's instantly appealing and gripping for the whole experience of the piece. A packed Festival Hall gave Boulez a rock-star reception after the music's coda."

Of the two works, Allan Kozinn preferred Incises, writing: "that work's Romanticism becomes portentousness in the update, and its sheer virtuosity have given way to abstraction and clockwork precision."

Sources

Further reading 
Boulez, Pierre. 2001. Incises pour piano (version 2001). Vienna: Universal Edition. UE 31 966. 
Fink, Wolfgang. 2000. Boulez: Sur Incises, programme booklet. Hamburg: Deutsche Grammophon CD 463 475-2.

External links 
 Universal Edition: Incises
 Universal Edition: Sur Incises
 Pierre Boulez: Sur Incises: A Lesson by Pierre Boulez, Medici.tv (in French) 
 Listen to Sur Incises on Jiwa

Compositions by Pierre Boulez
20th-century classical music
Serial compositions
Music dedicated to Paul Sacher